The 1980–81 Minnesota Golden Gophers men's basketball team represented the University of Minnesota as a member of the Big Ten Conference during the 1980–81 NCAA Division I men's basketball season.

Roster

Schedule and results

|-

|-
!colspan=9 style=| NIT

References 

Minnesota
Minnesota Golden Gophers men's basketball seasons
Minnesota
1980 in sports in Minnesota
1981 in sports in Minnesota